Montol is an Afro-Asiatic language spoken in Plateau State, Nigeria.  Dialects are Baltap-Lalin and Montol. Roger Blench (2017) uses the name Tel or Tɛɛl for Montol.

Notes 

West Chadic languages
Languages of Nigeria